The following is the list of political parties in Nepal registered in the Election Commission.

National parties 
A party registered with the Election Commission of Nepal is recognised as a national party only if it fulfils the two conditions listed below:
 The party needs to win at least one FPTP seat in Pratinidhi Sabha.
 The party gets at least 3% of the total valid proportional representation (PR) votes in Pratinidhi Sabha.

There are currently seven national parties in Nepal.

Other parties currently represented in the Federal parliament
A political party securing less than 3% of the PR votes will have to send its directly elected or FPTP candidates to the parliament as independent lawmakers. In other words, candidates from any political party failing to meet the criteria to become a national party will be ineligible to be represented  in parliament as a party.

There are currently five such political parties which failed to achieve national status yet are represented in Nepal's Parliament.

Parties currently represented only in provincial assemblies

Parties represented only in local government

Other parties

Defunct parties 
This is a list of defunct political parties of Nepal that have had some representation in the legislature.

See also

Politics of Nepal
List of communist parties in Nepal
List of regional and ethnicity based parties in Nepal

References

External links
List of parties at the Election Commission of Nepal

Nepal